Gordon "Scotty" Stirling (1928/1929 – November 11, 2015) was an American sports executive and a sportswriter. He was a longtime executive and scout in the National Basketball Association (NBA), including 27 years with the Sacramento Kings. In addition to roles with the Golden State Warriors and the New York Knicks, Stirling was the NBA's vice president of basketball operations.

Stirling began his career as a reporter with the Oakland Tribune. He later became a general manager for the Oakland Raiders in the American Football League (AFL) and the Oakland Oaks in the American Basketball Association (ABA). He was also the color analyst for Bill King on Raiders radio broadcasts.

Stirling is also credited with being one of the pioneers of fantasy football, helping to invent the concept in the 1960s. He later regretted not copyrighting the idea.

References

American male journalists
American sportswriters
Oakland Raiders executives
National Basketball Association league office executives
New York Knicks executives
Oakland Oaks executives
Sacramento Kings executives
1920s births
2015 deaths